Wuppertal-Barmen station is a station in the city of Wuppertal in the German state of North Rhine-Westphalia on the Elberfeld–Dortmund railway. Its entrance building is protected as a monument. It was Barmen Hauptbahnhof prior to Barmen's incorporation in Wuppertal in 1929. Before the Second World War it was an important stop for express trains and had substantial freight traffic. Its importance declined after the war in favour of Oberbarmen and since the renaming of the Elberfeld station as Wuppertal Hauptbahnhof. The Opernhaus Wuppertal is nearby.

Entrance Building 
The building is a rectangular construction of Muschelkalk stone in neoclassical style, with pilasters and arched windows. Originally it had projecting wings at each end with Ionic columns, but since the war only the western one is preserved. This portal wing is topped by a flat triangular tympanum and has tall rectangular windows and oculi in the panels below the beams. In the tympanum there is a small semi-circular window. The central axis is adorned by a clock, with the letters of "Wuppertal-Barmen" replacing the numbers.

History 
The first station building was opened with the Elberfeld–Dortmund line as Barmen station by the Bergisch-Märkische Railway Company on 9 October 1847. In 1905 the station's name was changed to Barmen Hauptbahnhof. The first building, which was a little to the east of the current building was demolished.

Relocation and construction of the new station building 

Construction of the current, only partly preserved, station building at Winklerstraße started in October 1911 and it was opened for the public on 10 October 1913. The plans of the building were drafted by the Prussian architect Rüdell Alexander, who worked in a leading position in the railway department of the Prussian Ministry of Public Works. The construction was directed by the government architect, Johannes Ziertmann and Edward Behne of the railway division of Elberfeld. The building was badly damaged in the Second World War.

The station building became a listed building on 1 July 1988.

Current operations  
The station Wuppertal-Barmen is currently served by the following passenger services:

References

Footnotes

Sources

 

Railway stations in Wuppertal
Rhine-Ruhr S-Bahn stations
S7 (Rhine-Ruhr S-Bahn)
S8 (Rhine-Ruhr S-Bahn)
S9 (Rhine-Ruhr S-Bahn)
Railway stations in Germany opened in 1847
1847 establishments in Prussia
Neoclassical architecture in Germany